On the Fiddle (released as Operation Snafu and Operation War Head in the United States) is a 1961 British comedy film directed by Cyril Frankel and starring Sean Connery, Alfred Lynch, Cecil Parker, Stanley Holloway, Eric Barker, Mike Sarne, Wilfrid Hyde-White, Kathleen Harrison, Victor Maddern and John Le Mesurier. It was based on the 1961 novel Stop at a Winner by R.F. Delderfield who served in the RAF in World War II.

It was Sean Connery's tenth film and his first lead role, released the year before his big breakthrough as James Bond in the 1962 film Dr No.

Plot
During the Second World War, spiv Horace Pope is taken to court for street peddling. In mitigation, he tells the magistrate he is working in the black market only while waiting to enlist in the war effort. On hearing this plea, the magistrate calls his bluff and forces him to sign up.

Pope joins the RAF. Very quickly, he makes friends with the easy going, but loyal, Pedlar Pascoe who happily goes along with all of his scams, which mainly involve taking money for leave passes and for organising postings close to home. The pair do their utmost to make a bit on the side and avoid being sent into action.

Their record eventually catches up with them, but by that time they've been sent on a mission to occupied France, where they continue their scams, selling food and supplies to the grateful newly-liberated French.

They unexpectedly become heroes, after killing a group of German soldiers who had them pinned down in a forest. They are decorated by the American forces, to whom they've been attached, and their commanding officer (who has a sneaking admiration for their schemes), tears up their record of crimes.

Full cast

 Alfred Lynch as Horace Pope
 Sean Connery as Pedlar Pascoe
 Cecil Parker as Group Captain Bascombe
 Stanley Holloway as Cooksley
 Alan King as Technical Sergeant Buzzer
 Eric Barker as Doctor
 Wilfrid Hyde-White as Trowbridge
 Kathleen Harrison as Mrs Cooksley
 Beatrix Lehmann as Lady Edith
 Eleanor Summerfield as Flora McNaughton
 Miriam Karlin as WAAF Sergeant
 Terence Longdon as Air Gunner
 Victor Maddern as First Airman
 Harry Locke as Huxtable
 John Le Mesurier as Hixon
 Viola Keats as Sister
 Peter Sinclair as Mr Pope
 Edna Morris as Lil
 Thomas Heathcote as Sergeant
 Brian Weske as Corporal
 Jack Lambert as Police Constable
 Cyril Smith as Ticket Collector
 Simon Lack as Flight Lieutenant Baldwin
 Graham Stark as Sergeant Ellis
 Jean Aubrey as WAAF Corporal
 Jack Smethurst as Dai Tovey
 Priscilla Morgan as Gwynneth Tovey
 Richard Hart as P.O. Trumper
 Ian Whittaker as Lancing
 Stuart Saunders as Sarge
 Monty Landis as Conductor
 Kenneth J. Warren as Dusty
 Neil Hallett as 1st Australian
 Patsy Rowlands as Evie
 Bill Owen as Corporal Gittens
 Harold Goodwin as Corporal Reeves
 Barbara Windsor as Mavis
 Toni Palmer as Ivy
 Ann Beach as Iris
 Gary Cockrell as U.S. Snowdrop
 Michael Sarne as German Officer

Production

Writing
The film was adapted by Harold Buchman from the 1961 novel Stop at a Winner by R. F. Delderfield who served in the RAF during World War II.

Filming
The fighting scenes in the woods were shot in and around "The Sandpit" on Horsell Common near Woking, Surrey. Interiors were completed at Shepperton Studios, Surrey.

US release

The film was not released in the United States until 21 May 1965, retitled "Operation Snafu" and later "Operation War Head" by the US distributor American International Pictures. The only purpose of the US release was to capitalise on the popularity of Sean Connery, who by then had become world-famous as James Bond in Dr No, From Russia with Love and Goldfinger. The titles, as well as the advertising campaign, downplayed the comedic aspects of the film as well as Connery's original second-billing. During a 1961 trip to England Alan King made a brief appearance in the film and forgot about it until the American release gave him second billing. He and Connery would work together again on The Anderson Tapes.

Reception
Reviewing the film in The New York Times, following its 1965 US release, Howard Thompson noted that the release was "an obvious cash-in" on Connery's popularity as James Bond, but found it, "a friendly little wartime comedy from England." He wrote that, "The wonder is that a picture with a story already done, gag by gag, a hundred times is so easy to take. It is, though — flip, friendly, brisk and a wee bit cynical in its take-it-or-leave-it jauntiness", and concluded that, "The film is familiar and trifling, but it's perky."

References

External links 

 

 British Comedy Guide: On the Fiddle

1961 films
British war comedy films
1961 comedy films
Films based on British novels
Films directed by Cyril Frankel
Films scored by Malcolm Arnold
British World War II films
Military humor in film
Films set in London
Films shot at Shepperton Studios
American International Pictures films
1960s English-language films
1960s British films